Dermot Kennedy is the debut compilation album by the Irish singer-songwriter and musician Dermot Kennedy. It was released on 4 January 2019. The album peaked at number 4 on the Irish Albums Chart.

Commercial performance
On 11 January 2019, the album entered the Irish Albums Chart at number 8. On 11 October 2019, the album reached a new peak of number 4, his debut studio album Without Fear entered at number one the same day.

Track listing

Charts

Weekly charts

Year-end charts

Release history

References

2019 albums
Dermot Kennedy albums